Thomas Cuming may refer to:

 Thomas B. Cuming (1827–1858), American military officer and politician
 Thomas Cuming (cricketer) (1893–1960), English cricketer